The Democratic Progressive Party was a small localist political party in Hong Kong established by Yeung Ke-cheong in 2015. It considered Chinese rule in Hong Kong foreign and promoted the right of Hong Kongers to self-determination. 

The party advocated non-violent struggle against what it saw as Chinese colonial rule, in sharp contrast to the more strident localists of Civic Passion and Hong Kong Indigenous. Yeung, the party's chairman, also hosted an online programme critical of other localists, especially Yeung's former mentor Wong Yuk-man, for their militant and populist tendencies.

In the 2016 Hong Kong Legislative Council election, Yeung formed a joint ticket with Hong Kong Localism Power's Jonathan Ho Chi-kwong. Yeung's candidacy was disqualified by the Electoral Affairs Commission as he did not sign both the original and additional confirmation forms to pledge to uphold the Hong Kong Basic Law. He campaigned for Ho who defeated incumbent Wong by a margin of 424 votes.

On 26 March 2017, party chairman Yeung Ke-cheong announced the dissolution of the party.

See also
 League of Social Democrats

Notes

References 

2015 establishments in Hong Kong
2017 disestablishments in Hong Kong
Defunct political parties in Hong Kong
Localist parties in Hong Kong
Political parties established in 2015
Political parties disestablished in 2017